The 1970 Watkins Glen 6 Hours was an endurance race held at the Watkins Glen Grand Prix Race Course, New York, United States on July 11, 1970. It was the ninth round of the 1970 World Sportscar Championship season.

Pre-race
John Wyer's team had not won a race since Spa and they came off a disastrous attempt at winning Le Mans; losing all three of their cars in 10 hours and the race to their sister team, Porsche Salzburg. Mario Andretti returned to Ferrari to try to help the great marque repeat their triumph at Sebring less than 4 months previously. Ferrari were keen on doing this; a win here would be sufficient comeuppance for them after their humiliating Le Mans run; all four works cars had retired after 4 hours and 4 of 6 other privately entered 512's also retired.

This particular race was one of 4 timed races on the calendar; the others being at Daytona, Sebring, and Le Mans. It was the only 6 hour race on the calendar in 1970.

Qualifying once again went to a Porsche; the Jo Siffert/Brian Redman 917K managed to edge out the Andretti/Giunti Ferrari 512S and the Rodriguez/Kinnunen 917K by three tenths of a second.

This would be the last Watkins Glen 6 Hours race on the original circuit. The circuit was rebuilt for the next year; they used the short track (as the extension had not yet been finished) and the whole track in 1972.

Race
At the start, Andretti took the lead from Siffert, but the Swiss driver took the lead back from Andretti on the third lap. He then lost the lead to Rodriguez. Later on in the race, Rodriguez attempted to switch off the 917K's headlights; but instead he switched off the fuel pumps, and the engine started to fail. Rodriguez was about to come into the pits, but then he realized what he had done, switched the pumps on, and then stormed through the field, made fastest lap and he & Kinnunen went on to win for the 4th time in the season. Wyer's team finished 1-2, and both cars finished on the same lap, with the works Ferrari of Andretti/Giunti completing the podium.

Official results

Did Not Finish

Statistics
Pole position: #1 John Wyer Automotive Engineering Porsche 917K (Jo Siffert/Brian Redman) - 1:06.3 (127.581 mph/205.322 km/h)
Fastest lap: #2 John Wyer Automotive Engineering Porsche 917K (Pedro Rodriguez)- 1:04.9 (124.833 mph/200.898 km/h)
Time taken for winning car to cover scheduled distance: 6 hours and 47.7 seconds
Average Speed: 189.592 km/h (117.807 mph)
Weather conditions: Sunny

References

Watkins Glen
Watkins Glen
Motorsport competitions in New York (state)